The 2017 Rally Argentina was the fifth round of the 2017 World Rally Championship and was the 37th running of the Rally Argentina. Thierry Neuville and Nicolas Gilsoul won the rally. Elfyn Evans and Daniel Barritt had led the rally for most of its stages, but after clipping a bridge on the final stage, the victory was Neuville's by just 7 tenths of a second.

WRC-2 championship leaders Pontus Tidemand and Jonas Andersson won the WRC-2 class, their third of the year.

Classification

Event standings

Special stages

Power Stage
The Power Stage was a  stage at the end of the rally.

Championship standings after the rally

Drivers' Championship standings

Manufacturers' Championship standings

References

External links
 The official website of the World Rally Championship

2017
2017 World Rally Championship season
2017 in Argentine motorsport
April 2017 sports events in South America